CIUT-FM is a campus and community radio station owned and operated by the University of Toronto. The station broadcasts live and continuously from Toronto on the 89.5 FM frequency. Programming can also be heard nationally via channel 826 on Shaw Direct, and over the internet via the CIUT website. The station is financially supported by donations and an undergraduate student levy.  CIUT-FM also broadcasts a Punjabi and Urdu language station, Sur Sagar Radio on a Subsidiary Communications Multiplex Operation frequency.

CIUT's studios are located on Tower Road on the University of Toronto campus, while its transmitter is located atop First Canadian Place in Toronto's Financial District.

History 
The station began as a closed-circuit broadcaster called Radio Varsity in 1966, later becoming Input Radio, UTR and then CJUT. All these versions of the station were only heard within the confines of the University of Toronto, thanks to an extensive network of loudspeakers, amplifiers, and cables strung through the extensive underground network of steam tunnels beneath the University's St. George campus. The station was granted a broadcast license and became CIUT-FM in 1986,  and on January 15, 1987, the station's FM broadcasts began to reach a considerably wider range across southern Ontario.

In 1999, CIUT was $150,000 in debt resulting in the student union taking over management, firing two employees, dismissing five volunteers, shortening time slots for other programs and selling late-night time slots to an internet broadcaster.

The next year, the station was sued by one of the dismissed programmers, Eddy Brake, who challenged his dismissal as well as the restructuring. The lawsuit was settled out of court in 2005.

Today, CIUT broadcasts at 15 kilowatts from a transmitter on the top of First Canadian Place in Downtown Toronto. With greater signal power than generally found at other community radio stations, CIUT's broadcast reaches as far as Barrie to the north, Buffalo to the south, Kitchener to the west and Cobourg to the east.

In 2009, CIUT moved from 91 St. George Street, the Victorian house it had occupied for 40 years, to new studios in Hart House. The old location was demolished in order to make way for the expansion of the Rotman School of Management.

In the fall of 2010, CIUT's board of directors cancelled station manager Brian Burchell's contract due to financial irregularities. As a result, program director Ken Stowar was appointed to the additional role of station manager.

In 2012, CIUT filed a lawsuit against Burchell seeking damages of $162,193.68 for what The Varsity newspaper described as "alleged long-term embezzlement" prior to his firing in October 2010.

In 2014, the CIUT transmitter of 27 years died, shutting the station off the air for a couple of days until a backup transmitter could be shipped to Toronto from Nova Scotia. In the ensuing fundraising drive, money was raised and a new transmitter was installed and operating by August.

Programming
Programs in the spoken word (talk radio) format include: local politics, current events and news; as well as programs focused on Indigenous Peoples, Women in Politics, African Canadian Families, Community Activism, and Health Care.

Musical programming includes many different genres such as folk, classical, Latino, world music, indie, rock, and electronic music. 
CIUT is the home of The Prophecy, the longest running drum and bass radio show in North America. 

Aside from being home to two of the longest running Hip Hop shows in Canada; The Drill Squad & The Masterplan Show, 6 Degrees has been recognized as one of the most influential Hip Hop radio shows in Toronto today.

Alumni
Former Radio Varsity/CIUT talent includes:
Paul Shaffer; 7T1, well-known musical director, producer, performer, and David Letterman sidekick.
Jeff Healey; blues guitarist
Mopa Dean; singer for hardcore punk band Armed and Hammered
Stacy Case; founder of the Pillow Fight League and amateur film maker
Lise Waxer; musicologist, professor and author of works about Latin Jazz
Dave O Rama; Former host and producer of the CIUT FM programs The Dream Consortium, Headstrokes and Alligator Wine. Current host and producer of The Lovecast on CHLY-FM Vancouver Island.
Cheri DiNovo; hosted The Radical Reverend before being elected to the Ontario legislature for the New Democratic Party of Ontario in 2006. Show resumed after she left office in 2017.
Mike Sullivan; former CBC master control radio operator, elected to Parliament of Canada as New Democratic Party of Canada in 2011.
Dominic LeBlanc; member of Board Of Directors, later Liberal Party of Canada Member of Parliament since 2000.
Michelle Marin; DJ, Producer and Host of Ultra Latino radio ; Since January 2015
Jonathan Culp; filmmaker, musician, media artist, and writer

References

External links
 CIUT-FM Web site
 Rock And Roll radio Podcast
 
 Decision CRTC 86-237
 

Iut
Iut
University of Toronto
Radio stations established in 1966
1966 establishments in Ontario